Mandsaur Fort (also known as Dashpur Fort), is situated in Mandsaur city in Mandsaur district in Indian state of Madhya Pradesh.

References 

Forts in Madhya Pradesh
Mandsaur
Tourist attractions in Mandsaur district